Serra Preta is a city located in the eastern state of Bahia, Brazil.  The population in this arid region is 14,699.  Serra Preta is about 150 miles northwest from Bahia's capital, Salvador, and 600 miles north of Rio de Janeiro.

History
Native peoples moved into the area, which sprung up around an establishment known as Taquari's farm.  In the 15th century, Portuguese explorers came to Brazil and claimed the land for Portugal.

Bahia became the center of sugar cultivation from the 16th to the 18th centuries.  Integral to the sugar economy was the importation of a vast number of African slaves; more than 35% of all slaves taken from Africa were sent to Brazil, mostly to be processed in Bahia before being sent to work in plantations elsewhere in the country.  This is reflected in Serra Preta's population, which is mainly mixed races, mostly African.

Economy
Because the air and land are so dry, it has always been hard to maintain and grow crops.  Serra Preta has a very small income from family-based farms and local artisans.  The government of Bahia provides very little to the poor, not only in terms of financial support, but also with lack of health care, schools and public services.

Many children get only a minimal education in reading, writing and arithmetic before having to quit school and immediately find work to help support their families.  Very few children make it to a high school level.  Young teenage children often travel into bigger cities and regions populated with more farmland in order to get work.  These young children send money back to their families while they work jobs that pay very little for their manual labor.

Lack of money is not the only problem for the people of Serra Preta.  In many South American countries, being a mixed race or having former slaves in a bloodline puts many families at a horrible disadvantage socially, and opportunities are scarce.  Hunger is a growing epidemic and the dry land does not provide a plentiful bounty.

In our advancing technological and digital world, Serra Preta falls more and more behind.  Providing the children of today with the means to provide for their families and themselves tomorrow will bring new hope to the region and the people of Serra Preta.

References

Municipalities in Bahia